Michele Mastrodonato (born 16 May 1965) is an Italian former boxer. He competed in the men's middleweight event at the 1988 Summer Olympics.

References

External links
 

1965 births
Living people
Italian male boxers
Olympic boxers of Italy
Boxers at the 1988 Summer Olympics
People from San Severo
Competitors at the 1987 Mediterranean Games
Mediterranean Games bronze medalists for Italy
Mediterranean Games medalists in boxing
Middleweight boxers
Sportspeople from the Province of Foggia
20th-century Italian people
21st-century Italian people